Federico Alonso Renjifo Vélez is the 25th Ambassador of Colombia to France dually accredited as Non-Resident Ambassador of Colombia to Algeria and Monaco. A Colombian lawyer and economist, he also served as the 30th Minister of Mines and Energy, and 10th Minister of the Interior.

Personal life
Federico Alonso was born in Cali, Valle del Cauca; the eldest of two sons of Marino Renjifo Salcedo and Amparo Vélez Hoyos; his younger brother is named Alejandro. He attended the Colegio Berchmans of Cali where he graduated in 1971. He went on to study at the Pontifical Xavierian University in Bogotá where he ultimately received his Doctorate of Laws and Socioeconomics with his co-authored doctoral thesis Ley Marco in 1981.

He is married to Catalina Crane Arango who is serving as High Presidential Advisor for Public and Private Management.

Career

General Secretary to the President
On 1 September 2011 President Juan Manuel Santos Calderón announced the designation of Renjifo to succeed Juan Carlos Pinzón Bueno as General Secretary to the President as the new Director of the Administrative Department of the Presidency of the Republic Renjifo, who at the time was working as President of the Fiduciaries Association since 2002, was sworn in on 8 September 2011.

Minister of the Interior
On 25 April 2012 President Santos designated Renjifo to succeed Germán Vargas Lleras in the Ministry of the Interior; he was later sworn in as Minister of the Interior on 17 May 2012 at an official ceremony at the Palace of Nariño.

References

Year of birth missing (living people)
Living people
People from Cali
Pontifical Xavierian University alumni
20th-century Colombian lawyers
Colombian economists
Colombian Liberal Party politicians
Directors of the Administrative Department of the Presidency of Colombia
Colombian Ministers of the Interior
Ministers of Mines and Energy of Colombia
Ambassadors of Colombia to Algeria
Ambassadors of Colombia to France
Ambassadors of Colombia to Monaco